Matthew Strachan (born 3 June 2005) is a Scottish professional footballer who currently plays as a defender for Inverness Caledonian Thistle in the Scottish Championship.

Club career 
Strachan made his professional debut in a 1–0 home loss to Hamilton Academical coming on as a substitute in injury time for Max Ram on 18 October 2022.

References 

2005 births
Footballers from Inverness
Inverness Caledonian Thistle F.C. players
Living people

Nairn County F.C. players